Bangkok Summer is a 2011 Malayalam film directed by Pramod Pappan Team. It features Rahul Madhav, Unni Mukundan and Richa Panai. The main themes of the movie are love, betrayal, money and race.

Plot
The film tells the story of Shrihari who, in search of his brother Madavan, makes it to Bangkok. In the middle of this search, Shrihari has to face many problems and struggles.

Cast
 Unni Mukundan as Madhavan (voice dubbed by Saran)
 Rahul Madhav as Shrihari
 Richa Panai as Ganga
 Rosin Jolly as Maria
 Sruthi Lakshmi as Razia
 Parvathi T. as Doctor 
 Anoop Sankar
 Arun
 Alex Mathew
 Sukumari as Patti
 jiyairani as willy

Production
Unni Mukundan a.k.a. Jayakrishnan and Rahul, who is a model in the Brooke bond ads, are the central characters. The heroine is Richa Panai, who is the girl in the Bhima commercial and several Chinese actors are also acting in this big budget picture. The film started production in August 2010 in Bangkok. Most of the film was shot in Bangkok.

References 

2010s Malayalam-language films
2011 romance films
2011 films
Indian romance films
Films directed by Pramod Pappan
Films scored by Ouseppachan